The following radio stations broadcast on FM frequency 97.5 MHz:

Argentina
 A in Posadas, Misiones
 Beat in Córdoba
 Cadena urbana in Río Tercero, Córdoba
 Clave in Puerto Esperanza, Misiones
 Concepto in Gualeguaychú, Entre Ríos
 Europa in Paraná, Entre Ríos
 La 97.5 in El Calafate, Santa Cruz
 La Perla in Andalgalá, Catamarca
 LRG885 Loventué in Loventué, La Pampa
 LRM943 Ella in Malabrigo, Santa Fe
 LRP748 Eme in Ceres, Santa Fe
 Más in La Carlota, Córdoba
 Mega in Punta Alta, Buenos Aires
 Quiero in Calchaqui, Santa Fe
 Radio María in Benito Juárez, Buenos Aires
 Radio María in Guaminí, Buenos Aires
 Radio María in Alejo Ledesma, Córdoba
 Radio María in Villa María, Córdoba
 Radio María in La Cruz, Corrientes
 Radio María in Lamarque, Río Negro
 Radio María in Apolinario Saravia, Salta
 Radio María in Sunchales, Santa Fe
 Radio María in Firmat, Santa Fe
 Radio Municipal in San Pedro de Jujuy, Jujuy
 Vale in Buenos Aires

Australia
 2HD in Port Stephens, New South Wales
 ABC Classic FM in Bathurst, New South Wales
 Vision Radio Network in Sale, Victoria
 Sapphire FM in Merimbula, New South Wales

Canada (Channel 248)
 CBAF-FM-20 in St. Edward, Prince Edward Island
 CBCE-FM in Little Current, Ontario
 CBEW-FM in Windsor, Ontario
 CBGA-4-FM in Lac-au-Saumon, Quebec
 CBRP-FM in Pincher Creek, Alberta
 CBRS-FM in Smithers, British Columbia
 CFFM-FM in Williams Lake, British Columbia
 CFNB-FM in D'Arcy, British Columbia
 CFXH-FM in Hinton, Alberta
 CHOX-FM in La Pocatiere, Quebec
 CHQX-FM-3 in Big River, Saskatchewan
 CHRS-FM in Cumberland House, Saskatchewan
 CIKO-FM in Carcross, Yukon
 CIQM-FM in London, Ontario
 CJAY-FM-2 in Lake Louise, Alberta
 CJKR-FM in Winnipeg, Manitoba
 CKDR-FM in Ear Falls, Hudson and Ignace, Ontario 
 CKRV-FM in Kamloops, British Columbia
 CKUA-FM-15 in Lloydminster, Alberta
 CKVV-FM in Kemptville, Ontario
 VF2205 in Kemano, British Columbia
 VF2349 in Ile-a-la-Crosse, Saskatchewan
 VF2400 in Keeseekoose First Nation, Saskatchewan
 VF2513 in Avola, British Columbia
 VF2587 in Edson, Alberta
 VF7302 in Quebec City, Quebec
 VOCM-FM in St. John's, Newfoundland and Labrador

Indonesia
Motion Radio in Jakarta
Prambors FM in Medan, North Sumatra

Ireland
Northern Sound in Carrickmacross, County Monaghan

Malaysia
 Kedah FM in Kedah, Perlis, Penang and Northern Perak
 Sinar in Kuala Terengganu, Terengganu

Mexico
 XHCAN-FM in Cancún, Quintana Roo
 XHCSBB-FM in Torreón, Coahuila
 XHENG-FM in Huauchinango, Puebla
 XHFAMA-FM in El Refugio, Chihuahua
 XHHP-FM in Ciudad Victoria, Tamaulipas
 XHNOS-FM in Nogales, Sonora
 XHNT-FM in La Paz, Baja California Sur
 XHPQ-FM in León, Guanajuato
 XHPVT-FM in Puerto Vallarta, Jalisco
 XHSCAJ-FM in Etzatlán, Jalisco
 XHSIAC-FM in Xalitla, Guerrero
 XHTZI-FM in Apatzingán, Michoacán
 XHVSD-FM in Ciudad Constitución, Baja California Sur
 XHXXX-FM in Tamazula de Gordiano, Jalisco

Morocco 
SNRT Amazigh in Agadir

Philippines
 DWLY in Baguio City
 DWOK-FM in Olongapo City
 DWNG in Lucena City
 DYHY-FM in Puerto Princesa City
 DZOK-FM in Naga City
 FMR Catanduanes in Virac
 DYMB in Iloilo City
 DYNE in Barili, Cebu
 DYFE in Tacloban City
 DXDV in Mati
 DXOO in General Santos City
 DXZC in Kidapawan City
 DXMK in Butuan City
 DXBP in Tandag City

United Kingdom
 97.5 Smooth Radio in the North East
Marlow FM In Marlow, Bucks

United States (Channel 248)
  in Merced, California
  in El Paso, Texas
  in Alta, Iowa
  in Natchitoches, Louisiana
 KDEE-LP in Sacramento, California
 KDKK in Park Rapids, Minnesota
  in Lander, Wyoming
 KDMI-LP in Canton, Texas
 KDOA-LP in Vancouver, Washington
 KEWR-LP in Cedar Rapids, Iowa
 KEXL in Pierce, Nebraska
 KFNC in Mont Belvieu, Texas
 KFTX in Kingsville, Texas
 KGKL-FM in San Angelo, Texas
  in Honolulu, Hawaii
 KHSI-LP in Conrad, Montana
 KHUG-LP in Castaic, California
 KIDH-LP in Meridian, Idaho
  in Junction City, Kansas
  in Linn, Missouri
  in Bismarck, North Dakota
 KLAK in Tom Bean, Texas
 KLMX-FM in Clayton, New Mexico
 KLQS-LP in Agua Dulce, California
 KLSB in Goleta, California
  in Riverside, California
  in Tulsa, Oklahoma
  in Dewey-Humboldt, Arizona
 KNDN-FM in Shiprock, New Mexico
  in Bend, Oregon
 KNMO-FM in Nevada, Missouri
  in Rochester, Minnesota
  in Doniphan, Missouri
  in Basin City, Washington
 KOTF-LP in Hayden, Idaho
  in Livingston, Montana
 KPPS-LP in St. Louis Park, Minnesota
 KQLO-LP in Clarksville, Arkansas
  in Chadron, Nebraska
  in Hot Springs, Arkansas
 KSHL in Lincoln Beach, Oregon
  in Sterling, Colorado
  in Oro Valley, Arizona
 KSZS-LP in Davis, California
 KTBB-FM in Troup, Texas
  in Tallulah, Louisiana
 KTRT in Winthrop, Washington
  in Mesquite, Nevada
 KVEX-LP in St. Cloud, Minnesota
  in Waco, Texas
  in Poncha Springs, Colorado
 KXXN in Iowa Park, Texas
 KYAB-LP in Abilene, Texas
 KYMI in Charlo, Montana
 KYSF in Bonanza, Oregon
  in Agana, Guam
 KZLF in Alva, Oklahoma
 KZNS-FM in Coalville, Utah
 WABD in Mobile, Alabama
 WAGI-LP in Kankakee, Illinois
  in Patchogue, New York
  in Louisville, Kentucky
 WBBA-FM in Pittsfield, Illinois
 WBWE-LP in Wilkes Barre, Pennsylvania
  in Columbia, South Carolina
  in Saint Marys, Pennsylvania
 WDIF-LP in Marion, Ohio
  in Breese, Illinois
 WFBB-LP in Glen Saint Mary, Florida
 WFHP-LP in Fort Kent, Maine
  in Watertown, New York
  in Hoosick Falls, New York
  in Rhinelander, Wisconsin
 WHLJ-FM in Statenville, Georgia
  in Champaign, Illinois
 WHMV-LP in Mohawk, New York
  in Mayaguez, Puerto Rico
  in Lansing, Michigan
 WJXB-FM in Knoxville, Tennessee
 WKDW-LP in North Port, Florida
  in Goodwater, Alabama
  in Kalkaska, Michigan
 WKTT (FM) in Salisbury, Maryland
 WLAW-FM in Whitehall, Michigan
 WLCI-LP in Nelsonville, Ohio
 WLGT in Washington, North Carolina
  in Lawrenceburg, Tennessee
 WLTF in Martinsburg, West Virginia
 WNRC-LP in Dudley, Massachusetts
  in Westerville, Ohio
  in Dover, New Hampshire
  in Akron, Ohio
  in Winter Haven, Florida
 WPEN in Burlington, New Jersey
  in Charleston, West Virginia
  in Carrboro, North Carolina
 WQSK in Madison, Maine
 WRQP-LP in Bennettsville, South Carolina
 WRSK-LP in Newton, New Jersey
 WTBD-FM in Delhi, New York
  in Union City, Ohio
 WTNN in Bristol, Vermont
  in Eastman, Georgia
 WUMJ in Fayetteville, Georgia
  in Greenfield, Ohio
 WVRV in Pine Level, Alabama
  in Oxford, Mississippi
  in Charlottesville, Virginia
 WYLA-LP in Charleston, South Carolina
  in Bridgman, Michigan
  in Rockford, Illinois
 WZZP in Hopkinsville, Kentucky

Vietnam
Dong Nai radio, Dong Nai province

References

Lists of radio stations by frequency